Qareh Nas (also Romanized as Qareh Nās; also known as Qarah Nāz) is a village in Anguran Rural District, Anguran District, Mahneshan County, Zanjan Province, Iran. At the 2006 census, its population was 656, in 143 families.

References 

Populated places in Mahneshan County